The Great Romance is a 1919 American silent romance film directed by Henry Otto and starring Harold Lockwood, Rubye De Remer and Frank Currier.

Main cast
 Harold Lockwood as Rupert Danza 
 Rubye De Remer as Althea Hanway 
 Joseph Granby as Prince Boris
 Frank Currier as King Rudolph 
 Helen Lindroth as Olga Marie 
 Franklyn Hanna as John P. Hanway 
 Clare Grenville as Mrs. Hanway

References

Bibliography
 Darby, William. Masters of Lens and Light: A Checklist of Major Cinematographers and Their Feature Films. Scarecrow Press, 1991.

External links

1919 films
1910s romance films
American romance films
Films directed by Henry Otto
American silent feature films
Metro Pictures films
American black-and-white films
1910s English-language films
1910s American films